Susan Janet Ballion (born 27 May 1957), known professionally as Siouxsie Sioux, is an English singer, songwriter, musician and record producer. She was the lead singer of the rock band Siouxsie and the Banshees (1976–1996). They released 11 studio albums, and had several UK Top 20 singles including "Hong Kong Garden", "Happy House" and "Peek-a-Boo", plus a US Top 25 single in the Billboard Hot 100, with "Kiss Them for Me".

Siouxsie also formed a second group, the Creatures (1981–2005). With the Creatures she recorded four studio albums and the hit single "Right Now". After disbanding the Creatures in the mid-2000s, she has continued as a solo artist,  just using the name Siouxsie, and released the album Mantaray to critical acclaim in 2007.

AllMusic named Siouxsie as "one of the most influential British singers of the rock era". Her songs have been covered by Jeff Buckley ("Killing Time"), Tricky ("Tattoo") and LCD Soundsystem ("Slowdive") and sampled by Massive Attack ("Metal Postcard") and the Weeknd ("Happy House"). In 2011, she was awarded for Outstanding Contribution to Music at the Q Awards and in 2012, she received the Inspiration Award at the Ivor Novello Awards.

In 2023, Siouxsie announced her return to the stage with US, European and UK dates from May 2023.

Biography

Early life (1957–1976)
Siouxsie was born Susan Janet Ballion on 27 May 1957 at Guy's Hospital in Southwark, England. She is ten years younger than her two siblings. Her brother and sister were born while the family was in the Belgian Congo. Her parents met in that colony and worked there for a few years. Her mother, Betty, was of Scottish and English descent and was a secretary who spoke both French and English. Her father was a bacteriologist who milked venom from snakes, and came from Wallonia, the French-speaking part of Belgium. In the mid-1950s, before Siouxsie's birth, the family moved to England.

The Ballions lived in a suburban district in Chislehurst, Kent. Siouxsie was an isolated child, being unable to invite friends to her house because of her alcoholic, unemployed father. Despite his issues, Siouxsie regarded him as intelligent and well-read, and sympathised with his inability to fit in with a "rigid, middle-class society". During moments of sobriety, her father shared with her his love for books. Siouxsie was aware that her family was different; the Ballions were not involved in the local community and Siouxsie, aware that her family's house differed from the neighbours', would later state that "the suburbs inspired intense hatred."

At the age of nine, she and a friend were sexually assaulted by a stranger. The assault was ignored by both her parents and the police, and was not spoken of in the family. The incident and its later treatment would lead Siouxsie to distrust adults. Years later, she stated: "I grew up having no faith in adults as responsible people. And being the youngest in the family I was isolated – I had no one to confide in. So I invented my own world, my own reality. It was my own way of defending myself – protecting myself from the outside world. The only way I could deal with how to survive was to get some strong armour."

Her father died of alcoholism-related illness when Siouxsie was 14 years old, resulting in a decline in her health. Siouxsie lost a great deal of weight and failed to attend school. After several misdiagnoses, she was operated on and survived a bout of ulcerative colitis. During the weeks of recovery in mid-1972, she watched television in the hospital and saw David Bowie on Top of the Pops.

At 17, she left school. During this period she began visiting the local gay discos frequented by her sister's friends. She later introduced her own friends to that scene. In November 1975, the Sex Pistols performed at the local art college in Chislehurst. Siouxsie did not attend, but one of her friends told her how they sounded like the Stooges, and that singer Johnny Rotten had threatened students attending the gig. In February 1976, Siouxsie and her friend Steven Severin went to see the Sex Pistols play in London. After chatting with members of the band, Siouxsie and Severin decided to follow them regularly. In the following months, journalist Caroline Coon coined the term "Bromley Contingent" to describe this group of eccentric teenagers devoted to the Sex Pistols.

Siouxsie became well known in the London club scene for her glam, fetish- and bondage-inspired attire, which later became part of punk fashion. She would also heavily influence the later development of gothic fashion with her signature cat-eye makeup, deep red lipstick, spiky dyed-black hair, and black clothing. In early September 1976, the Bromley Contingent followed the Sex Pistols to France, where Siouxsie was beaten up for wearing a cupless bra and a black armband with a swastika on it. She claimed her intent was to shock the bourgeoisie, not to make a political statement. She later wrote the song "Metal Postcard (Mittageisen)" (in memory of the anti-Nazi artist John Heartfield).

Following the DIY ethos and the idea that the people in the audience could be the people on stage, Siouxsie and Severin decided to form a band. When a support slot at the 100 Club Punk Festival (organised by Malcolm McLaren) opened up, they decided to make an attempt at performing, although at that time they did not know how to play any songs. On 20 September 1976, the band improvised 20 minutes of music while Siouxsie sang the "Lord's Prayer".

For critic Jon Savage, Siouxsie was "unlike any female singer before or since, commanding yet aloof, entirely modern". Viv Albertine from the Slits said: "Siouxsie just appeared fully made, fully in control, utterly confident. It totally blew me away. There she was doing something that I dared to dream but she took it and did it and it wiped the rest of the festival for me, that was it. I can't even remember everything else about it except that one performance."

One of Siouxsie's first public appearances was with the Sex Pistols on Bill Grundy's television show, on Thames Television in December 1976. Standing next to the band, Siouxsie made fun of the presenter when he asked her how she was doing. She responded: "I've always wanted to meet you, Bill." Grundy, who claimed he was drunk, suggested a meeting after the show, which provoked guitarist Steve Jones to respond with a series of expletives, never heard before on early-evening television. This episode created a media furore on the front covers of several tabloids, including the Daily Mirror, which published the headline "Siouxsie's a Punk Shocker". The event had a major impact on the Sex Pistols' subsequent career, and they became a household name overnight.

Aware of the press surrounding both herself and the Sex Pistols, Siouxsie began to distance herself from the scene and stopped seeing Sex Pistols after the 15 December 1976 gig at Notre Dame Hall. From then, she focused her energy on her own band, Siouxsie and the Banshees.

Siouxsie and the Banshees, and the Creatures (1977–2003)

In February 1977, Siouxsie began touring in England as Siouxsie and the Banshees. One year later, their first single, "Hong Kong Garden", reached number 7 in the UK Singles Chart; With its oriental-inflected xylophone motif, Melody Maker deemed it "a glorious debut [...] All the elements come together with remarkable effect. The song is strident and powerful with tantalising oriental guitar riffs plus words and vocals that are the result of anger, disdain and isolation. No-one will be singled out because everyone is part and parcel of the whole. It might even be a hit".

Their debut album, The Scream, was one of the first post-punk records released. It received 5-star reviews in Sounds and Record Mirror. The latter said that the record "points to the future, real music for the new age". The music was different from the single; it was angular, dark and jagged. The Scream was later hailed by NME as one of the best debut albums of all time along with Patti Smith's Horses. Join Hands followed in 1979 with war as the lyrical theme.

The 1980 album Kaleidoscope marked a change in musical direction with the arrival of John McGeoch, considered "one of the most innovative and influential guitarists" by The Guardian, and drummer Budgie, the latter of whom would continue to perform and record with Siouxsie  until 2004. The hit single "Happy House" was qualified as "great Pop" with "liquid guitar" and other songs like "Red Light" were layered with electronic sounds. Kaleidoscope widened Siouxsie's audience, reaching the top 5 in the UK charts. Juju followed in 1981, reaching number 7; the singles "Spellbound" and "Arabian Knights" were described as "pop marvels" by The Guardian. During recording sessions for Juju, Siouxsie and Budgie formed a percussion-oriented duo called the Creatures, characterized by a stripped-down sound focused on vocals and drums; their first record, the EP Wild Things, was a commercial success.

In 1982, the Siouxsie and the Banshees' album A Kiss in the Dreamhouse was widely acclaimed by critics. Richard Cook of NME depicted it as "a feat of imagination scarcely ever recorded". The single "Slowdive" was "a violin-colored dance beat number". They included strings for the first time on several songs. However, the recording sessions took their toll, and McGeoch was forced to quit the band.

In 1983, Siouxsie went to Hawaii to record the Creatures' first album, Feast, which included the hit single "Miss the Girl". It was her first incursion into exotica, incorporating sounds of waves, local Hawaiian choirs and local percussions. Later that year, Siouxsie and Budgie released "Right Now", a song from Mel Tormé's repertoire that the Creatures re-orchestrated with brass arrangements; "Right Now" soon became a top 20 hit single in the UK. Then, with the Banshees (including guitarist Robert Smith of the Cure), she covered the Beatles' "Dear Prudence", which reached number 3 on the UK Singles Chart. Two albums followed with Smith: Nocturne, recorded live in London in 1983, and 1984's Hyæna.  In 1985, the single "Cities in Dust" was recorded with sequencers; it climbed to number 21 in the UK charts. Entertainment Weekly noted that it was the first of a handful of Alternative rock radio hits in the U.S. 1986's Tinderbox and the 1987 covers album Through the Looking Glass both reached the top 15 in the UK.

In 1988, the single "Peek-a-Boo" marked a musical departure from her previous work, anticipating hip hop-inspired rock with the use of samples. The song was praised by NME as "oriental marching band hip hop with farting horns and catchy accordion" and hailed by Melody Maker as "a brightly unexpected mixture of black steel and pop disturbance". The Peepshow album received a five star review in Q magazine. The ballad "The Last Beat of My Heart" issued as a single, saw her exploring new ground with accordion and strings.

Siouxsie and Budgie then went to Andalusia in Spain to record the second Creatures album, Boomerang. The songs took a different direction from previous Creatures works, with backing music ranging from flamenco to jazz and blues styles. It featured brass on most of the songs. The first single was "Standing There". NME hailed Boomerang as "a rich and unsettling landscape of exotica". Anton Corbijn visited the group during the recording near Jerez de la Frontera, and Siouxsie convinced him to take photographs in color, unlike his prior work which was in black-and-white: the photos used for the promotion showed Siouxsie and Budgie in fields surrounded with sunflowers. In 1990, she toured for the first time with the Creatures, in Europe and North America.

On 1991's dance-oriented "Kiss Them for Me" single, Siouxsie and the Banshees used South Asian instrumentation, which had become popular in the UK club scene with the growth of bhangra. Indian tabla player Talvin Singh (who was later Björk's percussionist on her 1993 Debut album) took part in the session and provided vocals for the bridge. With "Kiss Them for Me", the Banshees scored a hit on the US Billboard Hot 100 peaking at number 23. After the release of Superstition which received enthusiastic reviews, the group co-headlined the first Lollapalooza tour, further increasing their American following.

In 1992, film director Tim Burton requested that she write a song for Batman Returns, and the Banshees composed the single "Face to Face".

In the mid-1990s, Siouxsie started to do one-off collaborations with other artists. Suede invited her to a benefit concert for the Red Hot Organization. With guitarist Bernard Butler, she performed a version of Lou Reed's "Caroline Says". Spin reviewed it as "haughty and stately". Morrissey, ex-lead singer of the Smiths, recorded a duet with Siouxsie in 1994. They both sang on the single "Interlude", a track that was initially performed by Timi Yuro, a female torch singer of the 1960s. "Interlude" was released under the name of "Morrissey and Siouxsie".

The last Banshees studio album, The Rapture, was released in 1995; it was written partly in the Toulouse area of France, where she had recently moved. After the accompanying tour, the Banshees announced their split during a press conference called "20 Minutes into 20 Years". The Creatures de facto became her only band. At the same time, she released the song "The Lighthouse" on French producer Hector Zazou's album Chansons des mers froides (which translates to Songs from the Cold Seas), with jazz trumpetist Mark Isham. Siouxsie and Zazou adapted the poem "Flannan Isle" by English poet Wilfred Wilson Gibson.

Her first live performance in three years was in February 1998 when former Velvet Underground member John Cale invited her to a festival called "With a Little Help From My Friends" at the Paradiso in Amsterdam. The concert was shown on Dutch national television and featured an unreleased Creatures composition, "Murdering Mouth", sung as a duet with Cale. The collaboration between the two artists worked so well that they decided to tour the US from June until August, performing "Murdering Mouth", and Cale's "Gun" together as the encores of a Creatures and Cale double bill.

The following year, Siouxsie and Budgie released Anima Animus, the first Creatures album since the split of the Banshees. It included the singles "2nd Floor" and "Prettiest Thing". The material diverged from their former work, with a more urban sound blending art rock and electronica. Anima Animus was described by The Times as "hypnotic and inventive". Also in 1999, Siouxsie collaborated with Marc Almond on the track "Threat of Love".

In 2002, she was rated as one of the 10 best female rock artists by Q. That same year, Universal released The Best of Siouxsie and the Banshees as the first reissue of her back catalogue.

In 2003, Siouxsie and Budgie released the last Creatures album, Hái!, which was in part recorded in Japan, collaborating with taiko player Leonard Eto (previously of the Kodo Drummers). Peter Wratts wrote in Time Out: "Her voice is the dominant instrument here, snaking and curling around the bouncing drumming backdrop, elegiac and inhuman as she chants, purrs and whispers her way around the album". He termed the record a "spine-tingling achievement". Hái! was preceded by the single "Godzilla!". That year, Siouxsie was featured on the track "Cish Cash" by Basement Jaxx, from their album Kish Kash, which later won Best Electronic/Dance Album at the Grammy Awards.

Solo (2004–present)

2004 was a pivotal year for the singer. She toured for the first time as a solo act combining Banshees and Creatures songs. A live DVD called Dreamshow was recorded at the last London concert, in which she and her musicians were accompanied by a 16-piece orchestra, the Millennia Ensemble. Released in August 2005, this DVD reached the number 1 position in the UK music DVD charts.

Her first solo album, Mantaray, was released in September 2007. Pitchfork wrote, "She really is pop", before finishing the review by declaring, "It's a success". Mojo stated: "a thirst for sonic adventure radiates from each track". Mantaray included three singles: "Into a Swan", "Here Comes That Day" and "About to Happen". In 2008, Siouxsie recorded vocals for the track "Careless Love" on The Edge of Love soundtrack by composer Angelo Badalamenti. She performed it with another Badalamenti number, "Who Will Take My Dreams Away", at the annual edition of the World Soundtrack Awards. After a year of touring, the singer played the last show of her tour in London in September 2008. A live DVD of this performance, Finale: The Last Mantaray & More Show, was released in 2009.

In June 2013, after a hiatus of five years, Siouxsie played two nights at the Royal Festival Hall in London during Yoko Ono's Meltdown festival. She performed 1980's Kaleidoscope album live in its entirety, along with other works from her back catalogue, and her performance was praised by the press. She also appeared at Ono's Double Fantasy concert, to sing the final song, "Walking on Thin Ice".

In October 2014, she and fellow Banshee Steven Severin compiled a CD titled It's a Wonderfull Life for the November 2014 issue of Mojo magazine, in which she appeared on the cover. The disc included 15 tracks that inspired the Banshees.

"Love Crime", her first song in eight years, was featured in the finale of the TV series Hannibal, broadcast in August 2015. Series creator Bryan Fuller, called it "epic".

In 2023, Siouxsie announced her return to the stage. She will headline the Cruel World Festival 2023 in Pasadena, California on Saturday 20 May. In June, Siouxsie will play in Athens in Greece, headlining the Release Athens 2023 on Friday 23 June. She will give a concert in Madrid in Spain, at the Noches del Botánico on Thursday 29 June. In July, she will play in Belfort in France, at the Eurockéennes as one of the headliners on Sunday 1 July. She will give a concert in Tynemouth near Newcastle in the UK, at Tynemouth Priory and Castle on Friday 7 July. She will perform at the Latitude Festival 2023 in Suffolk, as the headliner of the "BBC Sounds Stage" on Sunday 23 July. In August, she will give a concert in Lokeren in Belgium, at Lokerse Feesten on Monday 7 August. At the same period, Mantaray will be reissued with a different artwork on CD, via the official website: the album was remastered at Abbey Road Studios for its 15 year anniversary.

Songwriting
Journalist Paul Morley noted that Siouxsie's songs topics dealt with "mental illness, medical terrors, surreal diseases, depraved urges, sinister intensity, unearthly energy, sexual abuse, childhood disturbances, sordid mysteries, unbearable nervous anxiety, fairytale fears, urban discontent and the bleak dignity of solitude". Many of her songs are about damage; her childhood marked her profoundly. She said, "Damaged lives, damaged souls, damaged relationships. Most of the damage I sing about first happened when I was younger and I am still feeding off it and working it out. Early experiences are what create a lifetime of damage. The songs you write can help you fix the damage. And just the environment you are in is so important and can waste potential and corrupt something. For me, there was neglect. An alcoholic father who is not there because the most important thing for him is just to get alcohol and your mother is trying to compensate for the non-existent second parent so she's never there because she's working all the time and when she is around she's stressed out. Being isolated and not having anyone to connect with, there was just no physical touching back then".

Legacy

Siouxsie has been praised by artists of many genres. She had a strong impact on two trip-hop acts. Tricky covered 1983's proto trip-hop "Tattoo", to open his second album Nearly God, and Massive Attack sampled "Metal Postcard (Mittageisen)" on their song "Superpredators (Metal Postcard)" for the soundtrack to the film The Jackal.

Other acts have covered Siouxsie's songs. Jeff Buckley performed "Killing Time" several times, he first recorded it during a radio session for WFMU in 1992.  LCD Soundsystem recorded a cover of "Slowdive" for the B-side of "Disco Infiltrator", their version was also released on Introns. Santigold based her track "My Superman", on the music of "Red Light". In 2003, the Beta Band sampled "Painted Bird" and changed the title to "Liquid Bird" on their Heroes to Zeros album. Red Hot Chili Peppers performed "Christine" at the V2001 festival and introduced it to their British audience as "your national anthem". "Christine" was also revisited by Simple Minds. Indie folk group DeVotchKa covered "The Last Beat of My Heart" at the suggestion of Arcade Fire singer Win Butler in 2007. The Weeknd sampled "Happy House" on "House of Balloons" in 2011, and he performed it during his Super Bowl Halftime Show in 2021.

Morrissey said that "Siouxsie and the Banshees were excellent. They were one of the great groups of the late 70s, early 80s". In 1994, discussing modern bands, he also stated: "None of them are as good as Siouxsie and the Banshees at full pelt. That's not dusty nostalgia, that's fact". Another member of the Smiths, Johnny Marr, said: "Really my generation was all about a guy called John McGeoch, from Siouxsie and the Banshees. He was a great player". Marr hailed McGeoch for his work on Siouxsie's single "Spellbound". Marr qualified it as "clever" with "really good picky thing going on which is very un-rock'n'roll". Radiohead also cited McGeoch-era Siouxsie records when mentioning the recording of "There There". Their singer, Thom Yorke, said: "The band that really changed my life was R.E.M. and Siouxsie and the Banshees ...". "My favourite show I ever saw then was Siouxsie and she was absolutely amazing. ...  She's totally in command of the whole audience". Yorke added that she "made an especially big impression in concert, she was really sexy but absolutely terrifying." Sonic Youth singer and guitarist Thurston Moore named "Hong Kong Garden" as one of his 25 all-time favourite songs.

Siouxsie has influenced other bands ranging from contemporaries Joy Division, U2, and the Cure, to later acts like the Jesus and Mary Chain, Jane's Addiction and TV on the Radio. Joy Division co-founder Peter Hook said that The Scream inspired them for the "really unusual way of playing" of the guitarist and the drummer and cited the Banshees as "one of our big influences". U2 frontman Bono named her as an influence in the band's 2006 autobiography U2 by U2. He was inspired by her way of singing. "I still think that I sing like Siouxsie from The Banshees on the first two U2 albums". With his band, he selected "Christine" for a compilation made for Mojo's readers. U2 guitarist the Edge also was the presenter of an award given to Siouxsie at a Mojo ceremony in 2005. The Cure's Robert Smith related what the Join Hands tour brought him musically: "When we supported The Banshees in 1979, we suddenly became aware of how limited our palette was. I felt constrained, so when the opportunity arose to play with them I jumped at it and juggled the two bands for a while. It taught me a lot – they had fantastic rhythm sections and this made me think, ‘Why can’t I have this?’." For Smith's record The Head on the Door in 1985, he stated: "It reminds me of the Kaleidoscope album, the idea of having lots of different sounding things, different colours". Dave Navarro of Jane's Addiction once made a parallel between his band and the Banshees: "There are so many similar threads: melody, use of sound, attitude, sex appeal. I always saw Jane's Addiction as the masculine Siouxsie and the Banshees". Dave Sitek of TV on the Radio hailed the poppiest Siouxsie songs, citing their arrangements: "I've always tried to make a song that begins like "Kiss Them for Me". I think songs like "I Was a Lover" or "Wash the Day Away" came from that element of surprise mode where all of a sudden this giant drum comes in and you're like, what the fuck?! That record was the first one where I was like, okay, even my friends're going to fall for this. I feel like that transition into that record was a relief for me. Really beautiful music was always considered too weird by the normal kids and that was the first example where I thought, we've got them, they're hooked! I watched people dance to that song, people who had never heard of any of the music that I listened to, they heard that music in a club and went crazy". Dave Gahan of Depeche Mode said about her: "She always sounds exciting. She sings with a lot of sex–that's what I like". Mark Lanegan stated that he would like to collaborate with her: "In my wildest dreams I would love to sing with Siouxsie". She is also revered by Damon Albarn  and Dave Grohl. Omar Rodriguez-Lopez of the Mars Volta mentioned his liking for "the very textural side of Siouxsie".

Siouxsie has inspired many female singers. When asked if there was any figure who connected with her when she was just a listener, PJ Harvey replied: "It's hard to beat Siouxsie Sioux, in terms of live performance. She is so exciting to watch, so full of energy and human raw quality". Harvey also selected in her top 10 favourite albums of 1999, the Anima Animus album by Siouxsie's second band the Creatures. Sinéad O'Connor said that when she started, Siouxsie was one of her main influences. Tracey Thorn of Everything But the Girl wrote in her autobiography that Siouxsie was one of her heroines. Thorn paid homage to Siouxsie in the lyrics of her 2007 song "Hands Up to the Ceiling". Elizabeth Fraser of Cocteau Twins used to have a Siouxsie tattoo on her arm, and mentioned her liking for "Metal Postcard" to the members of Massive Attack in 1998. Sharleen Spiteri of Texas grew up listening to tracks such as "Hong Kong Garden" and was hooked by the Asian vibe present in the song; she stated that Texas' single "In Our Lifetime" was "our tribute to" "Hong Kong Garden". Garbage singer Shirley Manson cited her as an influence: "I learned how to sing listening to The Scream and Kaleidoscope". Manson also declared that Siouxsie embodied everything she wanted to be as a young woman. Manson would later write the foreword to Siouxsie & The Banshees: The Authorised Biography. Beth Ditto, of Gossip cited her as one of their influences for their 2009 album Music for Men. Ana Matronic of Scissor Sisters named Siouxsie as a source of inspiration and the Banshees as her favourite band. Siouxsie was also hailed by Romy Madley Croft of the XX, Kim Deal of the Pixies and the Breeders, and also by Josephine Wiggs of the Breeders, and namechecked by Karin Dreijer Andersson of the Knife. Kate Jackson of the Long Blondes said that Siouxsie was a part of her musical background, thanks to her "sharp lyrics" on Creatures' tracks like "So Unreal". Rachel Goswell mentioned her as a major influence: "From a singing point of view, I was inspired by Siouxsie Sioux, who I just adored. She's amazing. I've never seen anyone else quite like her"; her band Slowdive was named on a suggestion of Goswell, inspired by the Banshees' single of the same name. Lush were initially named "the Baby Machines", which the band culled from the lyrics of "Arabian Knights". Courtney Love of Hole wrote Siouxsie in her favourite records' list when she was a teenager in her diary. While talking about the band Savages, Love also stated: "They are amazing. ... It's kind of very Siouxsie Sioux". Kim Gordon of Sonic Youth said: "Initially I was really inspired by [...] Siouxsie, Patti Smith". FKA twigs named her as a main influence: "Every bit of music that I made sounded like a pastiche of Siouxsie [...] but through that I discovered myself". Róisín Murphy named Siouxsie when asked who were her biggest influences.

Other female artists who have stated their admiration for Siouxsie's work include Charli XCX, Hayley Williams of Paramore, Dolores O'Riordan of the Cranberries, Jennifer Charles of Elysian Fields, Ebony Bones, Toni Halliday of Curve, Kathleen Hanna of Bikini Kill, Chan Marshall a.k.a. Cat Power, Gillian Gilbert of New Order, Alison Goldfrapp, Sarah Cracknell of Saint Etienne, Florence Welch of Florence + the Machine, Chelsea Wolfe, Brody Dalle of the Distillers, Dee Dee of Dum Dum Girls, Joan As Police Woman, Lou Doillon, Emel Mathlouthi, Girlpool, Liz Phair, Billie Ray Martin, An Pierlé, Uffie, Lauren Mayberry of Chvrches, Meshell Ndegeocello, St. Vincent,  Anohni, Jehnny Beth of Savages, Wolf Alice, and Jenny Lee Lindberg of Warpaint. Santigold said: "I keep a Rolodex of the women that vocally inspire me. There aren't that many, but she's definitely one of them. I remember one of the first times I heard "Red Light" it was at a party, and I remember going up to the DJ and being like, "Who's this?". It was that good. I kind of stopped and was like ... wow. There's not a tremendous amount of women who are bold and forward thinking as artists. I feel like her music, at the time especially, was pretty unique in the way that it sort of matched her style. The freedom of experimenting with this dark place that doesn't have a place often in modern music". In 2022, Sky Arts rated her at number 14 in Britain’s top 50 most influential artists from the last 50 years.

Personal life
Siouxsie married band mate Budgie in May 1991. The following year, they moved to the southwest of France.

In an interview with The Sunday Times in August 2007, she announced that she and Budgie had divorced. In an interview with The Independent, she said: "I've never particularly said I'm hetero or I'm a lesbian. I know there are people who are definitely one way, but not really me. I suppose if I am attracted to men then they usually have more feminine qualities."

In 2023, she teamed up with PETA to protest animal testing. In a letter to Japanese conglomerate Ajinomoto, the world's largest manufacturer of monosodium glutamate (MSG), she wrote that the company "should be leading the way with compassion, not falling behind. Please, stop being spellbound by bad science and end these cruel tests immediately."

Awards and nominations
{| class="wikitable sortable plainrowheaders" 
|-
! scope="col" | Award
! scope="col" | Year
! scope="col" | Nominee(s)
! scope="col" | Category 
! scope="col" | Result
! scope="col" class="unsortable"| 
|-
! scope="row"|Ivor Novello Awards
| 2012
| Herself
| The Ivors Inspiration Award
| 
| 
|-
! scope="row"|MTV Video Music Awards
| 1989
| "Peek-a-Boo"
| Best Post-Modern Video
| 
| 
|-
! scope="row" rowspan=3|NME Awards
| 1980
| rowspan=3|Herself
| rowspan=3|Best Female Singer
| 
| rowspan=3|
|-
| 1981
| 
|-
| rowspan=1|1982
|

Discography
For her works with Siouxsie and the Banshees, see Siouxsie and the Banshees discography.

For her works with the Creatures, see the Creatures discography.

Solo album

Solo singles

Collaborative singles

DVD
 2005 Dreamshow No. 1 UK
 2009 Finale: The Last Mantaray & More Show No. 4 UK

Collaborations with other artists

In studio
 Morrissey: "Interlude"  (single recorded in duet) (1994)
 Hector Zazou: "The Lighthouse" (song recorded as guest on the Chansons des mers froides/Songs from the Cold Seas album) (1995)
 Marc Almond: "Threat of Love" (song recorded in duet for the Open All Night album) (1999)
 Basement Jaxx: "Cish Cash" (song recorded as guest on the Kish Kash album) (2003)
 Angelo Badalamenti: "Careless Love" (song recorded as guest for The Edge of Love film soundtrack) (2008)

Live
 Suede: "Caroline Says" (written by Lou Reed, performed on 30 July 1993 at a Red Hot & AIDS Benefit concert)
 John Cale: "Murdering Mouth" (a Siouxsie song; performed live as a duet in 1998 during The Creatures/John Cale's US double bill,  No How Tour)
 Yoko Ono: "Walking on Thin Ice" (duet performed on 23 June 2013 in London)

References

Bibliography
 Paytress, Mark. Siouxsie & the Banshees: The Authorised Biography. Sanctuary, 2003. 
 Johns, Brian. Entranced : the Siouxsie and the Banshees story. Omnibus Press, 1989.

Further reading

External links

 Siouxsie.com official website
 SiouxsieHQ news - official website
 SiouxsieandtheBanshees official website

1957 births
Alternative rock singers
British alternative rock musicians
English people of Belgian descent
British people of Walloon descent
English people of Scottish descent
Bromley Contingent
English contraltos
English women singer-songwriters
English new wave musicians
English record producers
English punk rock singers
English rock musicians
Women punk rock singers
Women new wave singers
Gothic rock musicians
Living people
Melodica players
People from Bromley
Singers from London
Siouxsie and the Banshees members
Ivor Novello Award winners
Musicians from Kent
British women record producers
British post-punk musicians
People from the London Borough of Southwark
20th-century English women singers
20th-century English singers
21st-century English women singers
21st-century English singers